The River Run riot was a violent confrontation between the Hells Angels and Mongols motorcycle clubs that occurred on April 27, 2002, in Laughlin, Nevada during the Laughlin River Run. The conflict began when members of the Hells Angels went to Harrah's Laughlin casino hotel to confront members of  Mongols because a police officer told members of the Hells Angels their Club Brothers were surrounded by Mongols. Not knowing it was peaceful. Members of the Hells Angels went to confront  Mongols because they were misled to believe their Club Brothers were in trouble by the police officer. Mongol Anthony Barrera, 43, was stabbed to death, and two Hells Angels, Jeramie Bell, 27, and Robert Tumelty, 50, were shot to death.

This was the first time that there were multiple murders in a Nevada casino.

Seven Hells Angels and six Mongols were imprisoned as a result of the event, and 36 other people had their charges dismissed. Frederick Donahue, one of the Hells Angels indicted after the incident, evaded capture for six years before surrendering in July 2008.

References

2002 riots
Laughlin, Nevada
Hells Angels
Mongols Motorcycle Club
Outlaw motorcycle club conflicts
Filmed killings
2002 in Nevada
Organized crime conflicts in the United States
Events in Clark County, Nevada